Calvary Presbyterian Church may refer to:

in the United States
 Calvary Presbyterian Church (San Francisco), California
 Calvary Presbyterian Church (Staten Island, New York)
 Calvary Presbyterian Church (Portland, Oregon)
 Calvary Presbyterian Church (Milwaukee), Wisconsin

See also 
 Calvary Church (disambiguation)